Niğde Anadolu Futbol Kulübü is a Turkish professional football club located in Niğde. The team currently competes in TFF Third League. The club was previously named Niğde Belediyespor and served as the developmental team for Galatasaray SK

League participations 
 TFF Second League: 2016-present
 TFF Third League: 2014–2016
 Turkish Regional Amateur League: 2010–2014

Stadium 
The home ground of Niğde Anadolu FK is the Niğde 5 Şubat Stadium in Niğde, which has a capacity of 5,000.

References

External links
Niğde Anadolu on TFF.org

TFF Second League
Football clubs in Turkey
Association football clubs established in 2018
Sport in Niğde
2018 establishments in Turkey